Lasiommata schakra, the common wall, is a species of satyrine butterfly found in South Asia.

Description

Shows slight sexual dimorphism. Male upperside ground colour silky brown; cilia of both wings whitish. Forewing has a transverse row of four large orange spots, the apical one the largest, bearing a black, white-centred eyespot; beyond the row of orange spots a subterminal dark brown line. Hindwing uniform, but bearing a postdiscal row of from three to six black, white-centred, orange-ringed eyespots. Underside very pale greyish white; forewing: disc orange, outwardly defined by a dark line, two lines across the discoidal cell, and a sinuous discal oblique line beyond its apex not extending to the tornus, orange-brown; subterminal and terminal dark lines; a subapical eyespot, as on the upperside, but with the outer ring paler, and a much smaller ocellus beyond it towards apex of wing. Hindwing has the basal half crossed by two sinuous curved slender lines, a shorter line crossing the cell only, and another short line defining the discocellular veins, orange brown; the curved row of ocelli as on the upperside, but each ocellus with rings of pale ochraceous and of brown, alternately two of each; lastly, a subterminal and a terminal brown line. Antennae brown; head and thorax studded with long dark grey pubescence; abdomen pale brown. Sex-mark present.

Female is similar but on the upperside, the orange spot bearing the ocellus on the forewing inwardly bordered by a broad, pale, short line; the raised band of specialized scales absent.

Wingspan of 56–58 mm.

Distribution
The Himalayas eastwards to Sikkim.

References

Lasiommata
Butterflies of Asia
Fauna of Pakistan
Taxa named by Vincenz Kollar
Butterflies described in 1844